Rising Tide(s) or The Rising Tide may refer to:

 "A rising tide lifts all boats", an aphorism

Film
 The Rising Tide (film), a 1949 Canadian short documentary film 
 The Rising Tide, a 2009 film narrated by Rosalind Chao
 A Rising Tide, a 2015 American romantic drama film

Literature 
 Rising Tide (Forgotten Realms novel), a 1999 novel by Mel Odom
 Rising Tide (Thesman novel), a 2003 young-adult novel by Jean Thesman
 The Rising Tide (Deland novel), a 1916 novel by Margaret Deland
 The Rising Tide (Shaara novel), a 2006 novel by Jeff Shaara
 Rising Tides, a 2011 novel in the Destroyermen series by Taylor Anderson

Music 
 Rising Tide Records, an American record label
 Rising Tide (Chesapeake album), 1994
 The Rising Tide (Sunny Day Real Estate album), 2000
 "The Rising Tide", a 2012 song by The Killers from the album Battle Born

Other uses
 Rising Tide Studios, an American media company 
 Rising Tide North America, a network of groups and individuals organizing action against the root causes of climate change 
 Rising Tide UK, part of the International Rising Tide Network
 Civilization: Beyond Earth – Rising Tide, a 2015 video game expansion pack 
 Enigma: Rising Tide, a video game

See also 

 Tide (disambiguation)
 High tide (disambiguation)
 The Rising Tied, a 2005 album by Fort Minor
 Vancouver Island Rising Tide, a Canadian rugby union team